Cheshmeh Shur (also Romanized as Cheshmeh Shūr and Cheshmeh-ye Shūr; also known as Shūr Cheshmeh and Cheshmeh Nūr) is a village in Qomrud Rural District, in the Central District of Qom County, Qom Province, Iran. At the 2006 census, its population was 177, in 42 families.

References 

Populated places in Qom Province